Electrofluidic display technology (EFD) is a new technology to display information which will compete with LCD and CRT displays.  Its goal is to achieve the same contrast ratio that can be achieved with paper and potentially provide better than 85 percent “white-state reflectance”.

It has a wide margin in critical aspects such as brightness, color saturation and response time.

There are working prototypes developed by collaboration between  University of Cincinnati, Sun Chemical, Polymer Vision and Gamma Dynamics.

Because the optically active layer can be less than 15 micrometres thick, project partners at PolymerVision see strong potential for rollable displays.

See also 
 Electronic paper
 Nature Photonics

References

Display technology